The women's 200 metre backstroke competition of the swimming events at the 2013 Mediterranean Games took place on June 22 at the Mersin Olympic Swimming Pool in Mersin, Turkey.

Schedule 
All times are Eastern European Summer Time (UTC+03:00)

Records 
Prior to this competition, the existing world and Mediterranean Games records were as follows:

Results

Heats

Final

References 

Women's 200 metre backstroke